The 1934 Paris–Tours was the 29th edition of the Paris–Tours cycle race and was held on 29 April 1934. The race started in Paris and finished in Tours. The race was won by Gustave Danneels.

General classification

References

1934 in French sport
1934
April 1934 sports events